The Flamborough sixth rates were basically repeats of the Maidstone Group and designed and built by Richard Stacey, Master Shipwright of Woolwich. Two vessels were ordered. Their armament was similar as were the dimensions of the vessels. They were constructed between 1706 and 1708.

Design and specifications
The construction of the vessels was assigned Woolwich dockyard. As with most vessels of this time period only order and launch dates are available. The dimensional data listed here Flamborough, whereas Squirrel will be listed in her aeticle. The tonnage calculation would be .

The gun armament as established in 1703 would be twenty 6-pounder cannon mounted on wooden trucks on the upper deck with four 4-pounder guns on the quarterdeck.

Ships of the Flamborough Group

Notes

Citations

References
 Winfield 2009, British Warships in the Age of Sail (1603 – 1714), by Rif Winfield, published by Seaforth Publishing, England © 2009, EPUB , Chapter 6, The Sixth Rates, Vessels acquired from 2 May 1660, Purchased Vessels (1706), Aldborough
 Winfield 2007, British Warships in the Age of Sail (1714 – 1792), by Rif Winfield, published by Seaforth Publishing, England © 2007, EPUB , Chapter 6, Sixth Rates, Sixth Rates of 20 or 24 guns, Vessels in Service at 1 August 1714, Purchased Vessels (1706), Aldborough
 Colledge, Ships of the Royal Navy, by J.J. Colledge, revised and updated by Lt Cdr Ben Warlow and Steve Bush, published by Seaforth Publishing, Barnsley, Great Britain, © 2020, EPUB , Section A (Aldborough)

 

Corvettes of the Royal Navy
Ships of the Royal Navy